Maghinardo Pagani (or Pagano) of Susinana (died 1302) was an Italian condottiero and statesman living in the 13th-14th centuries. He was seignior of Faenza and Imola, and attempted unsuccessfully to conquer also Forlì.

During the wars between Guelphs and Ghibellines, he sided initially for the former, fighting for Florence against Arezzo at the battle of Campaldino. Later, however, he was a long stance champion of the Ghibellines of Romagna, in alliance with the Ordelaffi of Forlì.

His granddaughter Marzia degli Ubaldini married Francesco II Ordelaffi, Lord of Forlì.

References

13th-century births
1302 deaths
13th-century condottieri
13th-century Italian nobility
14th-century Italian nobility
Lords of Faenza
Lords of Imola